Seetha Kalyanam is a 2009 Indian Malayalam-language family drama film written and directed by T. K. Rajeev Kumar, starring Jayaram, Jyothika, Indrajith Sukumaran and Geethu Mohandas.

Plot 
Sreeni, from a traditional Brahmin family, has a high paying job in Bangalore. His mother, a widow who runs a vegetarian hotel, is looking for the perfect match for him. The seemingly endless search for a perfect match has made Sreeni the butt of the jokes among his female colleagues. One of his colleagues, who he is also his best friend, is Nimisha. She considers him so close that she also fights with her parents to stay back in his quarters and nurse him when he is sick. His mother finally succeeds in finding a traditional girl in Abhirami; brought up in an Aghraharam. Her father Nellayi Ramaswami is a classical musician and Abhirami had initially been promised to his disciple Ambi, but the her parents ask him to forget her as Sreeni is a much better choice for her considering his stable income and family name.

The movie then shifts to the elaborate marriage ceremonies which last for a week. During this process, we are introduced to Abhirami's sister, who is unhappily married to an alcoholic and womanizing businessman who her parents had told her was a good match, forcing her to forget the love of her life, Venkidy. She questions her sister about her decision not to oppose the marriage though she was in love with Ambi. During the proceedings, Nimisha comes to realize that she was all along in love with Sreeni. She communicates her feelings to Sreeni, but both are loath to stop the marriage as it would be a big mental blow to the bride. Meanwhile, the bride's sister meets with Sreeni and informs him that Abhirami is actually in love with Ambi, and asks him to withdraw from the wedding. How the various knots are untied and lead to a happy ending forms the rest of the movie.

Cast

Production
The film was actually made in 2006, but was released only in 14 November 2009. It was Jyothika's second Malayalam movie. It was later dubbed into Tamil with the same title but was not released. It was also the last released film of actor Oduvil Unnikrishnan, who acted in this film when he was suffering from various ailments, and died shortly after.

References

2009 films
2000s Malayalam-language films
Films directed by T. K. Rajeev Kumar
Films scored by Srinivas